Platygobiopsis tansei is a species of goby found around Japan.

Etymology
The goby is named for the research vessel Tansei-maru of the Ocean Research Institute, University of Tokyo which is now Japan Marine Science and Technology Center. The ship was involved in collecting many specimens from Suruga Bay, including the type specimen of this goby.

References

Gobiidae
Fish of Indonesia
Taxa named by Muneo Okiyama
Fish described in 2008